The Rive Droite (Right Bank) is most commonly associated with the river Seine in central Paris. Here, the river flows roughly westwards, cutting the city into two parts. When facing downstream, the northern bank is to the right, and the southern bank (or Rive Gauche) is to the left.

The Right Bank's most famous street is the Champs-Élysées, with others of prominence being Rue de la Paix, Rue de Rivoli and Avenue Montaigne.

See also 
 Arrondissements of Paris
 Rive Gauche
 Bank (geography)

References 

Geography of Paris
River Seine